K. Piyasiri Wijenayake is a Sri Lankan politician and a former member of the Parliament of Sri Lanka.

References

Candidates in the 2019 Sri Lankan presidential election
Deputy chairmen of committees of the Parliament of Sri Lanka
Janatha Vimukthi Peramuna politicians
Jathika Nidahas Peramuna politicians
Living people
Members of the 13th Parliament of Sri Lanka
United People's Freedom Alliance politicians
Year of birth missing (living people)